Siberian languages may refer to any languages spoken in Siberia, including:

 Eskaleut languages, spoken in northeastern Siberia
 Siberian Finnish
 Siberian dialects of Russian, and other Russian dialects spoken in Siberia
 Mongolic languages, spoken in Siberia
 Paleosiberian languages, several linguistic isolates and small families
 Turkic languages, spoken in Siberia
 Tungusic languages, spoken in northern and eastern Siberia
 Uralic languages, spoken in northwestern Siberia
 Samoyedic languages, a branch of Uralic
 Yeniseian languages, spoken in central Siberia